The University of Bradford is a public research university located in the city of Bradford, West Yorkshire, England. A plate glass university, it received its royal charter in 1966, making it the 40th university to be created in Britain, but can trace its origins back to the establishment of the industrial West Yorkshire town's Mechanics Institute in 1832.

The student population includes  undergraduate and  postgraduate students. Mature students make up around a third of the undergraduate community. A total of 22% of students are foreign and come from over 110 countries. There were 14,406 applications to the university through UCAS in 2010, of which 3,421 were accepted.

It was the first British university to establish a Department of Peace Studies in 1973, which is currently the world's largest university centre for the study of peace and conflict.

History 

The university's origins date back to the Mechanics Institute, founded in 1832, formed in response to the need in the city for workers with skills relevant to the workplace. In 1882, the institute became the Bradford Technical College. In 1957, the Bradford Institute of Technology, was formed as a College of Advanced Technology to take on the running of higher education courses. Construction of the Richmond Building, the largest building on campus, began in 1963. The Horton Building and Chesham Building were subsequently added, on the opposite side of Richmond Road.

The charter of incorporation was granted in 1966, to create the University of Bradford; the then Prime Minister Harold Wilson became the university's first chancellor. In 1970s the university became an important international centre in the field of Yugoslav studies with the establishment of the University of Bradford Postgraduate School of Yugoslav Studies serving as a core institution in this effort. Research Unit in Yugoslav Studies at Bradford was established already in 1965 with significant involvement of British geographer Frederick Bernard Singleton. After her exile from South Africa AnnMarie Wolpe gained a post at the Bradford Department of Yugoslav Studies in 1963.

1980s and 1990s
Expansion of the main campus continued in the 1970s and onwards, with the addition of the Library and Computer Centre, Communal Building, Pemberton Building and Ashfield Building. An extension to the Library and Computer Centre was completed in the mid-1990s. In 1996, the university joined with the former Bradford and Airedale College of Health, which then became the School of Health Studies within the university. The Department of Physics was closed in the 1980s. The Department of Mathematics was closed to new undergraduates in 1997, with the remaining postgraduate activities and lecture support being integrated into the Department of Computing as the Mathematics Unit. The Department of Mathematics has since been reopened within the School of Computing, Informatics and Media.

In 1987, the university became one of the twelve founding members of the Northern Consortium.

21st century
In September 2009, it was announced that the university was to merge with Leeds College of Music. The college had originally announced a merger with Leeds Metropolitan University in April 2009. However, discussions broke down due to issues with the provision of further education courses at the college.
It was later announced that this merger would not go ahead due to financial constraints. LCM's degrees are now validated by the University of Hull.

Campus

Facilities
In 2005, a project to become an 'Ecoversity' was initiated, along with an £84 million redevelopment of the campus. The university aimed to reduce its environmental footprint by reducing waste and using sustainable materials. As part of this, Bradford became a Fairtrade University in December 2006.

As of 2008, several of the redevelopment projects have been completed. The Richmond Building has been partially re-clad with extra insulation and a new atrium; designed by local Saltaire-based architects Rance Booth & Smith; opened in December 2006, the roof of which uses ETFE – the same material used in the Eden Project. The university's cancer therapeutics research centre was moved from a separate site on All Saint's Road onto the main campus, into a new building which also provides conference facilities; the buildings on the old site were demolished in February 2008.

Redevelopment of the sports facilities was completed in summer 2009, and a new student village called "The Green" was constructed which opened in September 2011. The Green has the highest ever BREEAM rating for any building. Of the existing halls owned by the university, those on the Laisteridge Lane site were sold to Corporate Residential Management in 2005, and Shearbridge Green Halls were demolished in December 2006. Longside Lane halls and Kirkstone Halls were demolished during the first half of 2009.

The university has a "leading-edge 100-seat PC cluster" for teaching, learning and computer-based assessment, and there is an art gallery, theatre and music centre. The £84 million investment in the campus included a major refurbishment of the laboratories in the school of life sciences, creation of a new MBA suite and library at the school of management, refurbishment of the student union building, Student Central.

The university has won its campus the award for ‘Outstanding Contribution to Sustainable Development’ in The Times Higher Education Awards two years running.

Library
The J. B. Priestley library is open 24 hours, 360 days a year, it has 530,000 volumes, more than 1,100 printed periodical titles and approximately 60,000 electronic journals.

Organisation and governance

Chancellor
 Harold Wilson (1966–85) (served as the prime minister of the United Kingdom from 1964 to 1970 and again from 1974 to 1976; later became the Lord Wilson of Rievaulx)
 John Harvey-Jones (1986–91)
 Trevor Holdsworth (1992–98)
 Baroness Lockwood (1998–2005)
 Imran Khan (2005–2014) (prime minister of Pakistan from 2018 to 2022)
 Kate Swann (2015–present)

The current chancellor is businesswoman and University of Bradford graduate Kate Swann.

Vice-chancellor
E.G. Edwards (1966–78)
John West (1978–89)
David Johns (1989–98)
Colin Bell (1998–2001)
Chris Taylor (2001–07)
Mark Cleary (2007–13)
Brian Cantor (2013–2019)
Shirley Congdon

The first vice-chancellor was Dr E.G. Edwards, who as principal of the Bradford Institute of Technology took over the new institution.

The current vice-chancellor (since 2019) is Shirley Congdon.

Accommodation
The Green, which opened September 2011, is a £40 million purpose built student accommodation village. Designed for eco-friendly living, The Green has the highest ever BREEAM rating for any building (95.05%), awarded for sustainable building development and operation. It is also the first BREEAM 'Outstanding' student accommodation in the country.

Faculties
There are four academic faculties. These were previously called "schools" but changed their name in 2014 to avoid confusion with the sub-units also sometimes called schools. Many buildings and facilities, such as lecture theatres, are shared and used by all faculties.

Engineering & Informatics

On 1 October 2013, the School of Engineering, Design and Technology and the School of Computing, Informatics and Media were merged to form the Faculty of Engineering and Informatics. Three schools make up this new overarching Faculty: the School of Engineering (Mechanical and Energy Systems Engineering, Biomedical and Electronics Engineering, Civil and Structural Engineering & Chemical Engineering programmes), the School of Electrical Engineering and Computer Science (Electrical & Electronic Engineering, Computing & Maths programmes) and the School of Media, Design & Technology (Media & Design programmes).

The following describes the former schools of EDT & SCIM:

Computing, Informatics and Media

The second-largest school in the university consists of the departments of Computing, Bradford Media School (BMS), Creative Technology (CT) and Mathematics.

SCIM offers over 40 undergraduate degrees and postgraduate study in various areas including computing, ICT, robotics, mathematics, media and television. The School has a very lively research culture with over 100 students registered for MPhil/PhD.

The Department of Computing was one of the first in the UK to run an MSc course in Computing in 1967. Undergraduate courses began in 1970.

The EIMC department was founded in 1991 and developed its courses in conjunction with the School of Art, Design & Textiles at Bradford and Ilkley Community College (now known as Bradford College) and the National Museum of Photography, Film and Television (now the National Media Museum). It was one of the first departments to offer BSc courses in media technology, going on to introduce some of the first animation and computer games degrees, and more recently expanding to offer a new range of similar BA courses. Today, SCIM no longer works in association with the college, but has strengthened its relationship with the nearby National Media Museum. In association with the Department of Computing, it obtained a research grade 4 at RAE 2001.

A non-linear video editing / training suite is named in honour of the Shipley born film director Tony Richardson, and was opened by his daughter, the film actress Natasha Richardson in 1996.

In 2007 the School launched a partnership with East Coast Media at the Grimsby Institute and the National Media Museum to bid for Skillset Media Academy status, which was granted in 2008. Accreditation mainly covers courses in the Bradford Media School.

A core part of the school is the Innovations Unit, which offers the expertise of specialists within SCIM to commercial and social enterprises. This collaboration is part of a government initiative called Knowledge Transfer, which also includes partnerships with national and international companies. The IIU is also home to "Simula", which using knowledge transfer and resources for commercial projects including the school's motion capture suite for video games including Driver Parallel Lines, World Snooker Championships and GTR.

Engineering, Design and Technology
The university inherited several engineering courses from the Bradford Institute of Technology and some of these courses, such as Civil Engineering, are still taught today. All of the engineering courses are accredited by their relevant institute. The school also has a large number of both undergraduate and postgraduate design and technology courses. Its research areas include automotive engineering, polymers, telecommunications and advanced materials engineering.

From the establishment of the university in 1966, the individual branches of engineering were taught in separate departments. When reorganisation of the three faculties of the university took place, a single School of Engineering, Design and Technology was created and incorporated the Department of Mechanical Engineering, the Department of Civil & Structural Engineering, the Department of Electrical & Electronic Engineering and the Department of Industrial Studies. The Department of Chemical Engineering was closed shortly before the creation of the new school. However, in 2010, an undergraduate programme in Chemical Engineering was re-launched in 2010 with support from the Institute of Chemical Engineers – the first graduates from the three year BEng version of this course graduated in June 2013. In 2012 a postgraduate course was also launched.

Health Studies
Faculty of Health Studies was formerly the School of Nursing and Bradford and Airedale University of Health, this became part of the university in 1996; previously it was an associate college with the university validating its degrees. The School has moved to the main city campus, into the Horton A building which underwent major refurbishment in 2011. The Horton building was extended and another floor added to accommodate the School of Nursing. The School of Nursing was previously located on a separate site on Trinity Road, about 10 minutes walk from the main campus and near to St Luke's Hospital.

It specialises in degrees in nursing, physiotherapy, midwifery, occupational therapy and radiography. A specialist drug therapy course is run by the department and there are also part-time courses in dementia care. The department's student demographics are largely female, with a higher proportion of mature students.

The physiotherapy course is ranked 9th and 3rd in the 2014 and 2017 UK complete university guide.

Life Sciences
The Faculty of Life Sciences has the most students of all of the schools, with more than 2,000 students admitted to a variety of undergraduate courses in the areas of Biomedical Sciences, Chemical and Forensic Science, Clinical Sciences, Optometry, Pharmacy and Archaeological, Geographical and Environmental Sciences.

The Bradford School of Optometry and Vision Science (BSOVS) has its own Eye Clinic, situated in the DHEZ - Phoenix South West Building, providing Primary Care for the local community in conjunction with a student training facility. BSOVS also provides a variety of other clinical services (e.g. an Electro-diagnostic Unit opened October 2010) that people may be referred to by practitioners.

The Division of Chemical and Forensic Science runs a number of forensic science courses in conjunction with the Division of Biomedical Sciences and further undergraduate and postgraduate courses are being developed in the area of Biotechnology. The Division of Biomedical Sciences is also a contributor the Clinical Sciences degree, which commenced in 2002. Although the Division of Clinical Sciences provides a degree in its own right, as importantly there is provision for students to transfer to Leeds Medical School's MBChB programme.

The Centre for Skin Sciences is one of the largest academic centres in Britain for fundamental and translational skin and hair follicle research.

The Institute of Cancer Therapeutics has an excellent reputation for research and there is very close collaboration with staff from other divisions within the School.

The Division of Archaeological, Geographical and Environmental Sciences is located in refurbished, late 19th century mill buildings, housing extensive specialist facilities. Formerly a separate school, it was merged with Life Sciences in 2006.

Management, Law, and Social Sciences
The Faculty of Management, Law, and Social Sciences is a recent merger. Until 2018 Social Sciences was separate. In 2019, the university moved its Faculty of Management, Law and Social Sciences to its main city centre campus. It teaches courses in business, finance, accountancy, management and marketing. As of 2005 the department commenced teaching an accredited LLB law degree. It has a number of master's degrees, MBA programmes and doctoral programmes running alongside undergraduate programmes.

Its research is both international and interdisciplinary and has five main research groups covering all the main areas of management, and co-operative links and exchange agreements with 20 universities in America, Australia, Canada, Denmark, France, Holland, Spain and Sweden.

The School of Management has full Economic and Social Research Council (ESRC) accreditation for DBA and PhD programmes, portfolio Association of MBAs accreditation for MBA programmes and EQUIS accreditation.

Social and International Studies
The School of Social and International Studies covers the areas of development, economics, humanities (including English and history), politics, international relations, peace studies, psychology, criminology and social work. The school offers a range of taught undergraduate and postgraduate courses and has a number of active research areas, especially in conflict resolution. The school is actively engaged in the Programme for a Peaceful City initiative.

It contains six division (some of which were previously called Departments or Schools) Divisions of Economics, Peace Studies, International Development (BCID), Sociology and Criminology, Psychology and finally Social Care and Social Work.

The Centre for Psychology Studies offers a psychology course for undergraduates, accredited by the British Psychological Society. In 2008, Lord Winston officially opened new state of the art psychology laboratories, for teaching and research. One of the university's most popular courses, The National Student Survey ranked Psychology at Bradford as being within the Top 5 in the UK with 94% Student Satisfaction.

Academic profile

Motto
The motto which appears on most current University of Bradford publications is Making Knowledge Work, which relates to the institution's focus on courses that lead to employment. The university announced in June 2007 it was to use this phrase as a trademark.

However, the motto inscribed beneath the official coat of arms is Give Invention Light, which is taken from Shakespeare's Sonnet 38. The university has also used the slogans Be Inspired and Confronting Inequality, Celebrating Diversity in recent promotional material.

Reputation and rankings

The Times Good University Guide ranked Bradford 7th in UK for graduate employment in 2005 and 2nd in 2006.

The university has a strong reputation for research and knowledge transfer. It is ranked in the Top 50 English Universities based on research funding (HEFCE 2009–10).

Staff-student ratios are amongst the best in the UK (The University of Bradford is in the 2nd quartile for staff-student ratios in The Independent, The Times and The Guardian League Tables). The 2008 RAE reported that 80 per cent of academics at the university who submitted research to the panel are doing international or world-leading research.

Student life

Students' Union

Membership at the University of Bradford's Students' Union (UBU), is automatic upon confirmation of enrolment. UBU has advice services, a radio station, and runs many societies and sports clubs. The union is run by an annually elected Council, which includes an executive committee of six full-time sabbatical officers and nine non-sabbatical officers. The sabbaticals are slightly unusual within the sector, in having a ‘flat structure’, lacking a Union President: the post was abolished by then President Shumon Rahman in 2001.

The union is located in the Student Central building on campus, alongside the university bars, a cafe and shop, and the library. Union of Students (UBU) is available to assist students by giving necessary advice and information.

Activities
Students may make use of the ‘Unique’ centre which is located on campus. Facilities include a fitness suite, an indoor 25-metre swimming pool and a climbing wall.

The largest student involvement in their Union comes in the forms of the sports clubs (through the Athletics Union, commonly known as the AU), and the societies (through the Societies Federation). There is a wide variety of both, including many course related societies such as the Bradford Ophthalmic Optics Student Association. Students are also free to start their own societies.

The Student Union also has Ramair, one of the UK's longest running student radio stations, as well as a student newspaper and the long-established Bradford Student Cinema that regularly screens recent releases to students and staff for free. RamAir hosted the Student Radio Conference in 2012 with student Ian Thursfield winning a national award for Radio in 2011.

University Challenge
The university were champions of University Challenge in 1979 on 28 January 1979, when Bradford defeated Lancaster University in the third leg by 215 points to 160. It was less successful in 2004, achieving only 35 points, the joint 3rd lowest score ever recorded on the show.

Notable alumni

 Melih Abdulhayoglu – founder & CEO of Comodo Group
 Rinchinnyamyn Amarjargal – former PM of Mongolia
 Nick Baines – Bishop of Bradford, Bishop of Leeds and broadcaster
 Ian Barnes – Evolutionary genetics notable for his work on ancient DNA
 Amjad Bashir – Conservative MEP
 John Beaman – Channel Islands politician
 Crawford W. Beveridge – executive vice president and chairman of Sun Microsystems
 Roland Boyes – Labour MP
 Alex Brummer – journalist
 Jean-Jacques Burnel – bass guitarist in The Stranglers
 David Chaytor – Labour MP
 Chakufwa Chihana – Malawian pro-democracy activist, trade unionist and Second Vice President of Malawi
 Michael Clapham – Labour MP
 Nexhat Daci – former speaker of the Assembly of Kosovo
 Paul Donovan – CEO of Eircom Group
 Saeb Erakat – chief of the PLO Steering and Monitoring Committee
 Dame Janet Finch – former vice-chancellor of Keele University
 Martin Fletcher – NBC News Middle East correspondent
 David J. Francis – Chief Minister of Sierra Leone
 John Gater – archeological geophysicist, Time Team presenter
 Stephen Shaun Griffiths – serial killer
 Tori Good – BBC weather forecaster
 John Hegley – performance poet
 Stephen Hesford – Labour MP
 David Hinchliffe – Labour MP
 Felicia Hwang Yi Xin – actress, supermodel, Miss International Indonesia 2016 and Puteri Indonesia 2016 winner
 Mo Ibrahim – entrepreneur 
 Frederick William Jowett – Labour MP
 Clive Lewis – Labour MP
 Jeannette Littlemore – Professor of Linguistics
 Tula Lotay – comic book artist
 Riek Machar – former vice-president of the SPLM South Sudanese government. Head of the South Sudan rebel movement. 2013– 
 Bernard Mariette – global president of Quiksilver
 Steve McCabe – Labour MP
 Jon McGregor – writer
 Michael Meadowcroft – former Liberal MP
 Mehran Karimi Nasseri – Iranian refugee who lived in CDG airport
 Paul Ogwuma – Central Bank of Nigeria governor
 Stella Chinyelu Okoli – Nigerian businesswoman in pharmaceuticals
 Iffy Onuora – former footballer
 Tony O'Reilly – Chairman Independent News & Media Group, former CEO H.J. Heinz Company
 John Pienaar – BBC journalist
 Susan Price – vice-chancellor of Leeds Metropolitan University
 Bell Ribeiro-Addy – Labour MP
 Linda Riordan – former Labour MP
 Lloyd Russell-Moyle – Labour MP
 Aisha Salaudeen – CNN multimedia producer
 Charles Stross – Hugo Award-winning science fiction writer.
 Kate Swann – CEO of WH Smith
 Robert Swindells – author
 Ann Taylor – former Minister of State for International Defence and Security
 Benson Taylor – composer (honorary doctorate)
 Julian Thomas – Professor of archaeology at Manchester University and author of Understanding The Neolithic
 Hassan Ugail – professor 
 Paula Vennells – CEO of the Post Office
 David Ward – former Liberal Democrat MP for Bradford East
 Gavin Williamson – former UK Secretary of State for Education and former Secretary of State for Defence
 Sadegh Zibakalam – Iranian professor, writer and political analyst

See also
Armorial of UK universities
Bradford Sabres
College of advanced technology (United Kingdom)
List of universities in the United Kingdom
Plate glass university

References

External links

 
 University of Bradford Union
 Bradford Scholars – the University of Bradford research repository

 
Educational institutions established in 1966
University
1966 establishments in England
University
University
Universities UK